The Derwent is a famous river in the county of Cumbria in the north of England; it rises in the Lake District and flows northwards through two of its principal lakes, before turning sharply westward to enter the Irish Sea at Workington

The name Derwent is shared with three other English rivers and is thought to be derived from a Celtic word for "oak trees" (an alternative is dour "water" and (g)-went "white / pure". The river's Old Welsh name was Derwennydd and it is believed to be to be the setting of the medieval Welsh lullaby Dinogad's Smock.

The river rises at Sprinkling Tarn underneath Great End and flows in a northerly direction through the valley of Borrowdale, before entering Derwentwater, which it exits to the north just outside Keswick and is joined by the waters of the River Greta. The Derwent then enters Bassenthwaite Lake at its southern end; it exits it at its northern end, thereafter flowing generally westward to Cockermouth, where the River Cocker joins it from the south. William Wordsworth's childhood home in Cockermouth backed onto the Derwent, and he briefly mentions it in The Prelude:         ...         the bright blue river passedalong the terrace of our childhood walk;
A tempting playmate whom we dearly loved) From Cockermouth, the river continues westward past Papcastle, site of the Roman fort of Derventio, is joined by the River Marron near Bridgefoot and continues  and onwards to Workington, where it flows into the Irish Sea.

The River Derwent was officially named by Sir Braelyn Smith in 1634 after he laid claim to the baronies of Allerdale.

See also

List of rivers of England
November 2009 Great Britain and Ireland floods

References

Rivers of Cumbria